John Bruen (1560–1625) was an English Puritan layman, celebrated in his time for piety.

Early life
Bruen was the son of a Cheshire squire of Bruen Stapleford; the elder John Bruen was three time married. His union with Anne, the sister of Sir John Done, was childless, but his second wife brought him fourteen children, of whom Katharine, afterwards the wife of William Brettargh, and John, who, although not the eldest born, became by survivorship his heir, were noted for the fervour of their Puritanism. John was when young sent to his uncle Dutton at Dutton, where for three years he was taught by the schoolmaster James Roe. The Dutton family had by charter the control of the minstrels of the county. Young Bruen became an expert dancer. 'At that time,' he said, 'the holy Sabbaths of the Lord were wholly spent, in all places about us, in May-games and May-poles, pipings and dancings, for it was a rare thing to hear of a preacher, or to have one sermon in a year.' 

When about seventeen John Bruen and his brother Thomas were sent as gentlemen-commoners to St. Alban Hall, Oxford, where they stayed about two years. He left the university in 1579, and in the following year was married by his parents to a daughter of Mr. Hardware, who had been twice mayor of Chester. Bruen at this time hunted, and with Ralph Done kept fourteen couple of hounds.

Change of habits
On the death of his father in 1587 Bruen's means were reduced; he got rid of his dogs, killed the game, and disparked the land. His children were brought up strictly, and his choice of servants fell upon the sober and pious. One of these, Robert Pashfield, had a leathern girdle, which served him as a memoria technica for the Bible, marked into portions for the books, with points and knots for the smaller divisions. 

Bruen in summer rose between three and four, and in winter at five, and read prayers twice a day. His own seasons for prayer were seven times daily. An iconoclast, he removed the stained glass in Tarvin Church, and defaced the sculptured images. On Sundays he walked from his house, a mile distant, to the church, followed by most of his servants, and called on his tenants on the way, so that when he reached the church it was at the head of a procession. He rarely went home to dinner after morning prayers, but continued in the church till after the evening service. 

Bruen maintained a preacher at his own house, and later for the parish. Bruen's house became celebrated, and attracted visitors. William Perkins, the puritan divine, called Bruen Stapleford, 'for the practice and power of religion, the very topsail of all England.' His first wife died suddenly, and after a time he married Ann Fox, whom he first met at a religious meeting in Manchester. For a year they lived at her mother's house at Rhodes, near Manchester. He then returned to Stapleford, and again his house had visitors from the gentry.

Widower
Bruen's second wife died after ten years of married life, and as widower he broke up his household with its twenty-one boarders and retired to Chester. There he cleared the debt of his estate, saw some of his children settled, and maintained the poor of his parish by the produce of two mills in Stapleford, where he returned with his third wife, Margaret. 

He died after an illness, which was seen to be mortal, in 1625, at the age of 65. There was a portrait of him in Samuel Clarke's Marrow of Ecclesiastical History, later re-engraved for William Richardson. The life of John Bruen was not eventful, and he is mainly notable as an embodiment of the puritan ideal of a pious layman.

Views
The views that led Bruen to iconoclasm in his local church were described by William Hinde, curate at Bunbury, Cheshire. Hinde wrote a biography of Bruen that was published in 1641.

Bruen had an implicit belief in special providences, 'judgments,' and witchcraft. He kept a hospitable house, and was charitable to the poor of his neighbourhood and of Chester. He refused to drink healths even at the high sheriff's feast. Towards the end of his life his prayers were twice accompanied by 'ravishing sights.'  Among the Harleian MSS. is a compilation by him entitled 'A godly profitable collection of divers sentences out of Holy Scripture, and variety of matter out of several divine authors.' These are commonly called his cards, and are fifty-two in number. The same collection contains the petition of his son, Calvin Bruen, of Chester, mercer, respecting the treatment he received for visiting William Prynne when he was taken through Chester to imprisonment at Carnarvon Castle.

References

Attribution

1560 births
1625 deaths
People from Chester
16th-century Puritans
17th-century English Puritans